Chester Franklin "Jack" Blanton (January 29, 1921 – October 12, 2002) was an American politician, businessman, and newspaper editor.

Born in Shawnee, Kansas, Blanton moved with his family to Carrollton, Texas where his family owned a grain mill. During World War II, he helped build airfields. He received his bachelor's degree from Southern Methodist University in 1955. He was a newspaper editor and president of a bank. He served as Mayor of Carrollton, Texas from 1946 to 1948. Then, Blanton served in the Texas House of Representatives from 1969 to 1973 as a Democrat. His brother William W. Blanton also served in the Texas Legislature. Blanton died in Dallas, Texas.

Notes

1921 births
2002 deaths
People from Shawnee, Kansas
People from Carrollton, Texas
Southern Methodist University alumni
Businesspeople from Texas
Mayors of places in Texas
Democratic Party members of the Texas House of Representatives
20th-century American politicians
20th-century American businesspeople